Rasbora reticulata is a species of ray-finned fish in the genus Rasbora from Sumatra and Nias Island in Indonesia.

References 

Rasboras
Freshwater fish of Sumatra
Taxa named by Lieven Ferdinand de Beaufort
Taxa named by Max Carl Wilhelm Weber
Fish described in 1915